Paul Alamoti (born 22 January 2004) is an Australian professional rugby league footballer who plays as a  for the Canterbury-Bankstown Bulldogs in the National Rugby League (NRL). He has also represented New South Wales in the 2022 Under 19s State of Origin series.

Background 
Alamoti was born in Sydney, New South Wales.

Educated at Marist College Kogarah where he also excelled in basketball and athletics, Alamoti played his junior rugby league with the Milperra Colts, and played for the Bulldogs' Harold Matthews Cup and S. G. Ball Cup teams. In 2019, Alamoti was selected for the 2019 Australian Schoolboys merit team, and was also selected for the Harold Matthews Representative side. He also played for the Bulldogs' Jersey Flegg Cup side in 2021, at a remarkably young age of 17.

Playing career

2021 
On 17 March, Alamoti signed with the Canterbury-Bankstown Bulldogs until 2023.

2022 
Alamoti made his debut for the Canterbury-Bankstown Bulldogs in Round 7 of the 2022 Knock On Effect NSW Cup against the Mount Pritchard Mounties at Belmore Sports Ground. Alamoti was selected to represent New South Wales in the Under 19s State of Origin. Alamoti scored a try in the 18th minute, but later went off with a cheekbone injury in NSW's victory. He scored his first try with the Dogs against the North Sydney Bears in Round 21. Alamoti would appear in all matches for the Bulldogs during the 2022 NSW Cup finals series, including the club's grand final loss to the Penrith Panthers at CommBank Stadium.

On 7 November, Alamoti was named in the Bulldogs top 30 squad for 2023, extending his contract until the end of the 2024 season.

2023
In round 1 of the 2023 NRL season, Alamoti made his club debut for Canterbury in their 31-6 loss against Manly at Brookvale Oval.

References

External links 
 NSWRL profile
 Canterbury-Bankstown Bulldogs profile

2004 births
Living people
Australian rugby league players
Canterbury-Bankstown Bulldogs players
Rugby league centres
Rugby league players from Sydney